Han Xinyun and Zhang Kailin were the defending champions, but Zhang chose not to participate. Han partnered Chang Kai-chen and successfully defended her title, defeating Liu Chang and Lu Jiajing in the final, 6–0, 6–3.

Seeds

Draw

References 

 Draw

2015 ITF Women's Circuit
Wuhan World Tennis Tour